Louisiana is a state in the United States.

Louisiana may also refer to:

Historical places
Louisiana (New France), a historical North American region claimed by France, 1682–1763 and 1803
Louisiana (New Spain), a historical North American region claimed by Spain, 1764–1803
Louisiana Purchase, a vast area in North America bought by the United States in 1803
District of Louisiana, a temporary U.S. governmental district, 1804–1805
Louisiana Territory, a historic, organized territory of the United States, 1805–1812
French Louisiana, two distinct places of North America.

Other places
La Luisiana, a municipality in Spain
Louisiana, Kansas, a ghost town
Louisiana, Missouri, a city
Luisiana, Laguna, a municipality in the Philippines
Louisiana road (Croatia), an old road in Croatia
Luiziana, a city in Paraná, Brazil

Entertainment
"Louisiana 1927", a song by Randy Newman
 Louisiana a song by Underworld
Louisiana (1919 film), a lost 1919 American silent comedy film
Louisiana (1947 film), a movie starring Jimmie Davis, then governor of that state
Louisiana (1984 film), a TV movie by Philippe de Broca, also known as Lousiane
Louisiana, an 1880 novel by Frances Hodgson Burnett

Ships
USS Louisiana, five U.S. Navy ships have borne this name
CSS Louisiana, an 1862 ironclad ship of the Confederate States Navy
Louisiana (shipwreck), steamboat that sank during the Great Lakes Storm of 1913

Other
 Louisiana Ragin' Cajuns, the athletic program of the University of Louisiana at Lafayette
Louisiana Museum of Modern Art, near Copenhagen, Denmark

See also
University of Louisiana (disambiguation)